Irene Marie Models was a modeling and talent agency in Miami Beach, Florida. The agency was one of South Florida's first exclusive agencies. The agency closed in 2009.

History
Irene Marie Models was founded in 1983 in Fort Lauderdale, Florida by former international fashion model and fashion columnist Irene Marie. In 1989 Irene moved to South Beach.

In 2006 Irene Marie along with MTV launched 8th & Ocean, a television series chronicling the lives of models and staff at the Irene Marie Modeling agency.

Models and actors represented by Irene Marie 
Amber Smith
Bar Refaeli
Brett Novek
Cindy Taylor
Cynthia Bailey
David Fumero
Galen Gering
Garcelle Beauvais
Melania Trump
Niki Taylor
Eugena Washington

See also
 List of modeling agencies

References

Modeling agencies
1983 establishments in the United States
Entertainment companies established in 1983
Companies disestablished in 2009
Miami Beach, Florida